Ports of Call is a 1991 novel by the French-Lebanese writer Amin Maalouf. The narrative follows a married couple consisting of a Muslim man and a Jewish woman, Ossyane and Clara, who become separated after World War II. The échelles du Levant were Mediterranean seaports under Ottoman sovereignty where the French had traded from the 16th century with a near monopoly.

Reception
William Ferguson wrote in The New York Times wrote that the protagonists' "marriage is presented here as an exemplary rejection of suspicion and hatred between peoples, most particularly in the Middle East. Perhaps the author's fondness for allegory is the reason Ossyane's tale sounds more like polished writing than real speech, and why the characters often seem more like ideas than people."

See also
 1996 in literature
 Contemporary French literature

References

1996 novels
Novels by Amin Maalouf
Éditions Grasset books
Islam and Judaism